Colletotrichum lini is a fungal plant pathogen.

References

External links

lini
Fungal plant pathogens and diseases
Fungi described in 1926